Morning Exchange is a television business news programme that aired on CNBC Europe from 10 am to noon CET (9 am to 11 am GMT) between June 2003 and December 2005. The show was simulcast in the United States from 4 am to 5 am EDT.

Overview
The European Morning Exchange was originally presented by Ross Westgate and Patricia Szarvas (although Guy Johnson and Louisa Bojesen also became regular presenters) and contained rolling business news, focusing on the major European bourses. Segments included the Morning Meeting with an investment banker, and the 10:30 am Talking Point in which several CNBC Europe business news correspondents debated an issue of the day.

Morning Exchange used the same theme music as its CNBC United States counterpart, Morning Call. The programme began in June 2003, and replaced the similar programme European Market Watch. It ended its run on 16 December 2005 and was replaced by Worldwide Exchange.

2003 British television series debuts
2005 British television series endings
British television news shows
Business-related television series in the United Kingdom
CNBC Europe original programming